In number theory, specifically the study of Diophantine approximation, the lonely runner conjecture is a conjecture about the long-term behavior of runners on a circular track. It states that  runners on a track of unit length, with constant speeds all distinct from one another, will each be lonely at some time—at least  units away from all others.

The conjecture was first posed in 1967 by German mathematician Jörg M. Wills, in purely number-theoretic terms, and independently in 1974 by T. W. Cusick; its illustrative and now-popular formulation dates to 1998. The conjecture is known to be true for 7 runners or less, but the general case remains unsolved. Implications of the conjecture include solutions to view-obstruction problems and bounds on properties, related to chromatic numbers, of certain graphs.

Formulation

Consider  runners on a circular track of unit length. At the initial time , all runners are at the same position and start to run; the runners' speeds are constant, all distinct, and may be negative. A runner is said to be lonely at time  if they are at a distance (measured along the circle) of at least  from every other runner. The lonely runner conjecture states that each runner is lonely at some time, no matter the choice of speeds.

This visual formulation of the conjecture was first published in 1998. In many formulations, including the original by Jörg M. Wills, some simplifications are made. The runner to be lonely is stationary at 0 (with zero speed), and therefore  other runners, with nonzero speeds, are considered. The moving runners may be further restricted to positive speeds only: by symmetry, runners with speeds  and  have the same distance from 0 at all times, and so are essentially equivalent. Proving the result for any stationary runner implies the general result for all runners, since they can be made stationary by subtracting their speed from all runners, leaving them with zero speed. The conjecture then states that, for any collection  of positive, distinct speeds, there exists some time  such that

Interpreted visually, if the runners are running counterclockwise, the middle term of the inequality is the distance from the origin to the th runner at time , measured counterclockwise. This convention is used for the rest of this article. Wills' conjecture was part of his work in Diophantine approximation, the study of how closely fractions can approximate irrational numbers.

Implications 

Suppose  is a -hypercube of side length  in -dimensional space. The conjecture generalizes this observation into any number of dimensions.

In graph theory, a distance graph  on the set of integers, and using some finite set  of positive integer distances, has an edge between  if and only if . For example, if , every consecutive pair of even integers, and of odd integers, is adjacent, all together forming two connected components. A -regular coloring of the integers with step  assigns to each integer  one of  colors based on the residue of modulo . For example, if , the coloring repeats every  integers and each pair of integers  are the same color. Taking , the lonely runner conjecture implies  admits a proper -regular coloring (i.e., each node is colored differently than its adjacencies) for some step value.

Given a directed graph , a nowhere-zero flow on  associates a positive value  to each edge , such that the flow outward from each node is equal to the flow inward.

Known results
In this notation, the conjecture asserts that , a bound which, if correct, cannot be improved. For example, if the runner to be lonely is stationary and speeds  are chosen, then there is no time at which they are strictly more than  units away from all others, showing that . Alternatively, this conclusion can be quickly derived from the Dirichlet approximation theorem. For  a simple lower bound  may be obtained via a probability argument.

The conjecture can be reduced to restricting the runners' speeds to positive integers: If the conjecture is true for  runners with integer speeds, it is true for  runners with real speeds.

Tighter bounds 
Slight improvements on the lower bound  are known.  showed for  that if  is prime, then , and if  is prime, then .  showed unconditionally for sufficiently large  that

 proved the current best known asymptotic result: for sufficiently large ,

for some constant . He also showed that the full conjecture is implied by proving the conjecture for integer speeds of size  (see big O notation). This implication theoretically allows proving the conjecture for a given  by checking a finite set of cases, but the number of cases grows too quickly to be practical.

The conjecture has been proven under specific assumptions on the runners' speeds. For sufficiently large , it holds true if

In other words, the conjecture holds true for large  if the speeds grow quickly enough.

For specific  

The conjecture is true for  runners.

There exists an explicit infinite family of such sporadic cases.

 formulated a sharper version of the conjecture that addresses near-equality cases.

Other results 

In other words, runners with random speeds are likely at some point to be "very lonely"—nearly  units from the nearest other runner. The full conjecture is true if "loneliness" is replaced with "almost aloneness", meaning at most one other runner is within  of a given runner. The conjecture has been generalized to an analog in algebraic function fields.

Notes and references

Notes

Citations

Works cited

External links 

Article in the Open Problem Garden no. 4, 551–562.

Diophantine equations
Conjectures
Unsolved problems in number theory